Demasiado Diego is a live album by  Diego Gutiérrez. It was recorded from a concert Diego gave at the Pablo de la Torriente Brau Cultural Center in Havana, Cuba, as part of the series of Trova recitals called A guitarra limpia. In this recording, Gutiérrez uses a small acoustic format and only with his guitar, showing his songs in the purest style of Nueva Trova.

Track listing 
All songs are written by  Diego Gutiérrez

Personnel 

Vocals, acoustic guitar on all tracks: Diego Gutiérrez

Electric guitar, acoustic guitars and backing vocals: IT Duo

Minor percussion: Ariel Marrero

Backing vocals: Rochy and Hakely Nakao

Record producer: Diego Gutiérrez

Executive producer: Centro Pablo de la Torriente Brau

References

External links 

 Demasiado Diego on Last.fm
 Demasiado Diego on LETRAS.COM

2006 albums
Spanish-language albums